The Broadway Kids was a concert group based in New York from 1994 to 2004. The group consisted of a rotating company of children, aged 8 to 16, who have performed in at least one Broadway, Off-Broadway or major national touring production. They performed concerts singing showtunes from various musicals, appearing at special events such as Broadway on Broadway, and have recorded five Broadway-centric CDs, one Christmas CD, and two Pop-centric CDs. The Broadway Kids have also appeared in the Off-Broadway show The Broadway Kids Sing Broadway, which has been produced in various theatres in New York and elsewhere. After releasing "Hey Mr. DJ!" in 2002, The Broadway Kids quit recording CDs. They continued to tour throughout 2004 and disbanded shortly after.

Members
Notable past Broadway Kids have included:
Lacey Chabert (Les Misérables, Family Guy, and Mean Girls)
Ashley Tisdale (Les Misérables, Annie, The Suite Life of Zack & Cody, High School Musical (franchise) and Phineas and Ferb)
Christy Carlson Romano (Even Stevens, Cadet Kelly, The Even Stevens Movie and Kim Possible)
Chris Trousdale (Les Misérables, The Sound of Music and member of teen pop boy band Dream Street)
Greg Raposo (Dream Street)
Jesse Eisenberg (numerous, including Academy Award nomination for The Social Network)
Andrea Bowen (Jane Eyre, Sugar Beats and The Sound of Music, Desperate Housewives)
Eden Riegel (Les Misérables, The Will Rogers Follies)
Jenna Ushkowitz (Glee)
Kathryn Zaremba (Annie Warbucks, Full House, and Toothless)
Brandon Uranowitz (Tony Award nominee, An American in Paris, Falsettos)
Stephen Scott Scarpulla (Les Misérables, Dora the Explorer)
Crysta Macalush Winton (The Who's Tommy and Les Miserables)
Erin Rakow (Les Miserables, The Diary of Anne Frank, and Sugar Beats)

Discography
 The Broadway Kids Sing Broadway        (1994, Lightyear)
 The Broadway Kids at the Movies        (1997, Lightyear)
 The Broadway Kids Sing Christmas       (1997, Lightyear)
 The Broadway Kids Back on Broadway     (1998, Lightyear)
 The Broadway Kids Sing America         (2000, Lightyear)
 The Broadway Kids The Best of Broadway (2001, Lightyear)
 The Broadway Kids Hey Mr. DJ!          (2002, Lightyear)

External links

Broadway theatre